Ganjabad-e Sofla may refer to:
 Ganjabad-e Sofla, East Azerbaijan
 Ganjabad-e Sofla, Kerman

See also
 Ganjabad-e Pain (disambiguation)